Snowed In is the first Christmas album by American pop rock group Hanson. It was quickly released following the success of their previous album, Middle of Nowhere, and was recorded in London.  Snowed In was also the best-selling holiday album for 1997 in the United States, selling 863,000 copies that year according to Nielsen SoundScan.  It has since sold a total of 1,081,000 copies in the US.

The album features a mix of traditional Christmas carols (such as "Silent Night Medley"), covers of Christmas themed songs (such as "Rockin' Around the Christmas Tree" and "Merry Christmas, Baby") and Hanson's own compositions (such as "At Christmas" and "Christmas Time").

Commercial performance
Total sales were around 2 million, though 1.2 million of these were sold in the United States. The album both debuted and peaked at position number 7 on the U.S. Billboard 200 album sales chart in December 1997, and was certified Platinum by the Recording Industry Association of America on December 15, 1997 for shipment of one million copies in the U.S.

The album also had a quick run on the Swedish albums chart and peaked at number 14.

Track listing
 "Merry Christmas Baby" (Lou Baxter, Johnny Moore) – 3:12
 "What Christmas Means to Me" (Anna Gordy Gaye, George Gordy, Allen Story) – 3:43
 "Little Saint Nick" (Mike Love, Brian Wilson) – 3:33
 "At Christmas" (Isaac Hanson, Taylor Hanson, Zachary Hanson) – 5:17
 "Christmas (Baby Please Come Home)" (Barry, Ellie Greenwich, Phil Spector) – 3:20
 "Rockin' Around the Christmas Tree" (Johnny Marks) – 2:38
 "Christmas Time" (Isaac Hanson, Taylor Hanson, Zachary Hanson, Mark Hudson) – 3:59
 "Everybody Knows the Claus" (Isaac Hanson, Taylor Hanson, Zachary Hanson) – 4:47
 "Run Rudolph Run" (Marvin Brodie, Johnny Marks) – 3:11
 "Silent Night Medley: O Holy Night/Silent Night/O Come All Ye Faithful" – 5:26
 "White Christmas" (Irving Berlin) – 1:49

Personnel
 Danny Clinch – photography
 Matthew Cordle – piano
 Laurence Cottle – bass
 Margery Greenspan – art direction
 Hanson – arranger, producer, executive producer
 Isaac Hanson – guitar, vocals
 Taylor Hanson – piano, organ, keyboards, Wurlitzer, vocals
 Zac Hanson – drums, percussion, vocals
 Mark Hudson – arranger, guitar (rhythm), producer
 Ted Jensen – mastering
 Ian Kirkham – saxophone
 Nadia Lanman – cello
 Tom Lord-Alge – mixing
 Richard Patrick – design
 Iain Roberton – engineer
 Chris Taylor – bass
 Andy Wright – keyboards, programming
 Paul Wright – engineer

Charts

Weekly charts

Year-end charts

References

Mercury Records albums
Hanson (band) albums
1997 Christmas albums
Albums produced by Mark Hudson (musician)
Christmas albums by American artists
Pop Christmas albums